Royal G. "Mac" McCracken (born November 16, 1941) is an American former politician. He served in the South Dakota Senate from 2001 to 2008.

References

1943 births
Living people
People from Madison, South Dakota
Businesspeople from South Dakota
Republican Party South Dakota state senators
21st-century American politicians
People from Rapid City, South Dakota